John Herbert Quick House — also known as "Coolfont" — is a historic home located near Berkeley Springs, Morgan County, West Virginia, US.  It was built in 1913, and is a large -story mansion in the Colonial Revival style. The front facade is two stories and features a pediment, with a one-story rounded portico topped by a balustrade.  It was built by author John Herbert Quick (1861-1925).

In 1961 the house and about 1200 surrounding acres were acquired by businessman Sam Ashelman, who went on to establish a hotel called the Coolfont Resort in 1965.  The property, including the house, was sold to a real estate developer in 2005.   In 2017 the house sold to an unnamed bidder for $225,000 as part of an auction of the entire former resort property.

The house was listed on the National Register of Historic Places in 1984.

References

Houses on the National Register of Historic Places in West Virginia
Colonial Revival architecture in West Virginia
Houses completed in 1913
Houses in Morgan County, West Virginia
National Register of Historic Places in Morgan County, West Virginia
1913 establishments in West Virginia